The Tunnel 88 is a tunnel in Nangan Township, Lienchiang County, Taiwan.

History

The tunnel was dug and enlarged by the Republic of China Armed Forces in 1974 to accommodate tanks in the aftermath of Second Taiwan Strait Crisis with the People's Liberation Army in 1958. It took them 10 years to fully finish the work. It was then named Tunnel 88 to commemorate the 88th birthday of Chiang Kai-shek in 1975, the year he died. The tunnel was then later used by Chunghwa Telecom for apparatus room. In 1992, it was handed over to Matsu Distillery. Currently the tunnel is used to store jugs of Kaoliang liquor.

Architecture
At the front entrance of the tunnel, there are rows of wine jug stacks.

Geology
The tunnel is a granite rock type with 264 meters long. The front side faces the sea and the back side faces the former Nangan military airport. The temperature inside the tunnel is 15-20°C.

See also
 List of tourist attractions in Taiwan

References

1974 establishments in Taiwan
Nangang Township
Tunnels completed in 1974
Tunnels in Lienchiang County
Tunnel warfare
Military history of Taiwan